Eaton Park is a large public park located in Eaton, Norwich, England.

History
The park was laid out in 1923 as part of a public works programme instigated by the city council to try and address the post-war crisis of  mass-unemployment.  It was opened to the public in 1928 by the Prince of Wales, later Edward VIII.

Facilities
Attractions include a boat pond, crazy golf, a children's playground, a skate park, tennis courts, a putting green and bowling facilities. The park is also home to formal rose garden and a lily pond. A bandstand surrounded by four pavilions, known as the Rotunda, lies in the centre of the park. The pavilions house a café, changing rooms, toilets and park running and tennis clubs. The bandstand hosts concerts and other events throughout the summer. Norwich parkrun takes place every Saturday morning, which has had over 400 events with an average of nearly 400 runners per run. It is 80 acres in area.

References

Parks and open spaces in Norwich